Bacterial leucyl aminopeptidase (Aeromonas proteolytica aminopeptidase) is an enzyme. This enzyme catalyses the following chemical reaction

 Release of an N-terminal amino acid, preferentially leucine, but not glutamic or aspartic acids

This is a zinc enzyme.

References

External links 
 

EC 3.4.11